August Maria Christiaan De Winter (12 May 1925 – 30 July 2005) was a liberal Belgian politician of the PVV. Between 1965 and 1971, he was burgomaster of Grimbergen. He was State Secretary of the regional economy of Brussels in the government Tindemans-De Clercq (25 April 1974 – 3 June 1977) and State Secretary of the district of Brussels in the government Martens-III (18 May 1980 – 22 October 1980). De Winter ended his political career as a member of the European parliament.

References
 Overview of Belgian governments and liberals (Liberaal archief)
 August De Winter (in memoriam, in newspaper)

1925 births
2005 deaths
Mayors of places in Belgium
Members of the Chamber of Representatives (Belgium)
People from Grimbergen
Place of death missing